Panic is a 1963 British crime film directed by John Gilling and starring Dyson Lovell, Janine Gray and Glyn Houston. The screenplay concerns a young Swiss woman who becomes mixed up with a gang planning a diamond heist.

Cast
 Janine Gray - Janine Heinig 
 Glyn Houston - Mike 
 Dyson Lovell - Johnnie Cobb 
 Duncan Lamont - Inspector Saunders 
 Stanley Meadows - Tom 
 Brian Weske - Ben 
 Charles Houston - Louis Cobb 
 Philip Ray - Jessop 
 Marne Maitland - Lantern 
 John Horsley - Inspector Malcolm 
 Leonard Sachs - Len Collier 
 Colin Rix - Detective Sergeant Rose 
 Dermot Kelly - Murphy

Critical reception
TV Guide called it "A hollow crime melodrama"; whereas The Dark Side called it "an atmospheric British noir."

References

External links

1963 films
1960s heist films
Films directed by John Gilling
British heist films
British black-and-white films
1960s English-language films
1960s British films